West College Avenue Historic District is a national historic district located at Hartsville, Darlington County, South Carolina.  The district encompasses 22 contributing buildings in a primarily residential section of Hartsville. They were constructed between about 1906 to about 1930, with the majority constructed between 1910 and 1926. They illustrate a period of significant development which saw the town's population increase more than five times its size at the turn of the 20th century. The architecture reflects late-19th and early-20th century movements such as Victorian, Queen Anne, Colonial Revival, and Bungalow.

It was listed on the National Register of Historic Places in 1994.

References

Houses on the National Register of Historic Places in South Carolina
Historic districts on the National Register of Historic Places in South Carolina
Victorian architecture in South Carolina
Colonial Revival architecture in South Carolina
Queen Anne architecture in South Carolina
Historic districts in Darlington County, South Carolina
National Register of Historic Places in Darlington County, South Carolina
Houses in Hartsville, South Carolina